Two for flinching is a children's game in which one person tries to make another person flinch. Two for flinching or Two For Flinching may also refer to:

"Two For Flinching", a 1993 single by the punk rock band Kerosene 454
"Two for Flinching", a song on the 2000 Kid Dynamite hardcore punk album, Shorter, Faster, Louder
Two For Flinching, a 2006 stand-up comedy CD by Christian Finnegan